Sosensky (masculine), Sosenskaya (feminine), or Sosenskoye (neuter) is the name of several inhabited localities in Russia.

Urban localities
Sosensky, Kaluga Oblast, a town in Kozelsky District of Kaluga Oblast

Rural localities
Sosensky, Oryol Oblast, a settlement in Lukovsky Selsoviet of Maloarkhangelsky District in Oryol Oblast